Across the Plains may refer to:
 Across the Plains (1939 film), an American Western film by Spencer Gordon Bennet
 Across the Plains (1928 film), a silent Western film by Robert J. Horner
 Across the Plains (1911 film), an American Western by Broncho Billy Anderson and Thomas H. Ince
 Across the Plains (1910 film), an American silent Western film by Francis Boggs
 Across the Plains (book), the middle section of Robert Louis Stevenson's three-part travel memoir

See also
 The Plains Across, a historical monograph by John D. Unruh, Jr.